Sokółka is a town in northeastern Poland, seat of the Sokółka County in Podlaskie Voivodeship. It is a busy rail junction located on the international Warsaw–Białystok–Grodno line, with additional connections which go to Suwałki and the Lithuanian border.

History 

The settlement was founded as a royal village located on the route connecting Knyszyn and Grodno. Sokółka was granted town rights by King Sigismund III Vasa in 1609. The town's layout with its central square is attributed to starost Antoni Tyzenhauz.

In the Third Partition of Poland, in 1795, the town was annexed by Prussia, and in 1807 it passed to the Russian Partition of Poland. In 1861, Walery Wróblewski came to Sokółka and founded a secret organization in preparation for a Polish uprising, which broke out in 1863. He was one of the main organizers of the January Uprising in the territory between Białystok and Grodno. He organized an insurgent unit and commanded in many battles in the region, and eventually became one of the leaders of the uprising for the entire Podlachia and Grodno regions. Sokółka was one of the sites of Russian executions of Polish insurgents during the January Uprising. Following World War I, in 1918, Poland regained independence and control of the town.

In the course of the Soviet invasion of Poland at the start of World War II, Sokółka was captured by the Red Army on 21 September 1939, and then occupied by the Soviet Union under which it was annexed into the Byelorussian SSR on 14 November 1939. It was administered as a part of the Belastok Region of the Byelorussian SSR. Several Poles from Sokółka, including the town's mayor, were murdered by the NKVD in the large Katyn massacre in April–May 1940. Sokółka was under German occupation fron June 1941 until 24 July 1944. It was administered as a part of the Bialystok District of Nazi Germany.  The Germans established the Sokółka Ghetto for the imprisonment of Polish Jews. The ghetto served as staging point for deportations to death camps during the Holocaust similar to most Jewish ghettos across the occupied country. The Jews of all surrounding villages and towns including Krynki, Janów, Czyżew, and Zaręby Kościelne were kept there. In total, 8,000–9,000 people were murdered. The main synagogue was destroyed. The Jewish community was not restored.

On 24 July 1944, troops of the 2nd Belorussian Front of the Red Army dislodged the German occupying forces from the town. Its administration reverted intitially to the Byelorussian SSR, but on 16 August 1945, it was restored to Poland. Administratively it was located in the "large" Białystok Voivodeship until 1975, then the "small" Białystok Voivodeship until 1998.

Sights
The sights of Sokółka include the Museum of Sokółka Land (Muzeum Ziemi Sokólskiej), historic townhouses and the historic churches: the Catholic church of St. Anthony built in a neoclassical style in 1848, and the St. Alexander Newski's Orthodox Church from 1830.

Transport
Sokółka is located on the S19 highway, parts of which (including the local part) are still under construction (as of 2021). There is also a train station in the town.

Sports
The local football club is Sokół Sokółka. It competes in the lower leagues.

Twin towns—sister cities

Sokółka is twinned with:

  Rochlitz, Germany
  Šalčininkai, Lithuania

References 

Cities and towns in Podlaskie Voivodeship
Sokółka County
Trakai Voivodeship
Sokolsky Uyezd
Białystok Voivodeship (1919–1939)
Belastok Region
Holocaust locations in Poland